Elkton is an unincorporated community in Oakdale Township, Washington County, Illinois, United States.

References

Unincorporated communities in Washington County, Illinois
Unincorporated communities in Illinois